(literally 'five to seven') is a French-language term for activities taking place after work and before returning home (sometimes using overtime  as an excuse), or having dinner (roughly between 5 and 7 p.m.).
 

In Quebec 
In Quebec French, the term stands for a social gathering.  It may bring together friends or colleagues or may be organized around a specific event, such as a book launch or vernissage.  Wine, beer, and cocktails are served along with finger foods and other hors d'oeuvres. Such a party held later may be named for the specific time (e.g. , meaning "six to eight").

A  can be a formal gathering held in a wide range of public and private spaces, such as art galleries, university campuses, and places of work, but it is also commonly used more informally as a promotion in bars to attract patrons. The English equivalent might be a semi-formal "wine and cheese" gathering or an informal "happy hour".

In France 
 originally referred to a time for a tryst, and consequently is a metonym for a visit to one's mistress, an extramarital affair, and the mistress involved. It derived from the time of day French people would make such a visit. It is still commonly considered as the time of day to meet one's mistress or lover, and the term implies a sexual liaison (as opposed to the Québécois habit).

References

Eating parties
Culture of Quebec
Drinking culture
Canadian cuisine
High society (social class)
Upper class culture in Canada
Upper class culture in Europe